Staphylococcus rostri is a Gram-positive, coagulase-negative member of the bacterial genus Staphylococcus consisting of clustered cocci.  This species was originally isolated from the noses of healthy pigs; the name is derived from the Latin rostrum or "the snout of a swine".

Staphylococcus rostri may serve as a source or reservoir of antibiotic resistance genes seen in Staphylococcus aureus.

References

External links
Type strain of Staphylococcus rostri at BacDive -  the Bacterial Diversity Metadatabase

rostri
Bacteria described in 2009